Vyacheslav Melnikov may refer to:

 Vyacheslav Melnikov (alpine skier) (born 1931), Soviet Olympic skier
 Vyacheslav Melnikov (footballer, born 1954), Russian football player (senior career 1975–1986) and coach (1991–2008)
 Vyacheslav Melnikov (footballer, born 1975), Russian football player (senior career 1991–2007)